Opposition Bloc (Russian: Оппозиционный блок), formerly called Opposition Bloc — Party for Peace and Development (Russian: Оппозиционный блок - Партия мира и развития) until June 2019, was a Ukrainian political party that was founded in 2019. On 8 June 2022 the party was banned in court. This decision was not appealed, so on 25 July 2022 the party ceased to exist.

The creation of the party was the result of a schism in the Opposition Bloc party, a party of the same name founded in 2014. By January 2019, two wings of this party had nominated two different candidates for the 2019 Ukrainian presidential election. Yuriy Boyko was nominated by the party wing called Opposition Platform — For Life, while a competing party wing wanted to nominate Oleksandr Vilkul as its candidate. The party wing supporting Vilkul formed a new party, Opposition Bloc — Party for Peace and Development. That new party proceeded to nominate Vilkul as its presidential candidate. In the 2019 Ukrainian parliamentary election, the new party won six single-seat constituencies, and its nationwide list won 3.23% of the votes, failing to overcome the 5% election barrier.

Legally, Opposition Bloc — Party for Peace and Development is the successor of the Industrial Party of Ukraine (Russian: Индустриальная Украина) founded in 2014.

Party leaders
 Evgeny Murayev (chairman and leader of electoral list)
 Oleksandr Vilkul (co-chair)
Political Council 
 Borys Kolesnikov
Fraction in Verkhovna Rada leader
 Vadym Novynskyi

History
In 2014, six parties that did not endorse Euromaidan merged into a new party called Opposition Bloc. In the 2014 Ukrainian parliamentary election, the party won 29 seats, predominantly in the Dnipropetrovsk, Donetsk, Zaporizhzhia, Luhansk, and Kharkiv oblasts.

According to Ukrayinska Pravda, in the summer of 2018, negotiations began regarding the unification of the parties For Life (which had split from Opposition Bloc in 2016) and Opposition Bloc. Ukrayinska Pravda reported that these talks were instigated by Serhiy Lyovochkin, who, along with Dmytro Firtash, controlled one of the wings of Opposition Bloc; Rinat Akhmetov controlled the other wing of Opposition Bloc. In early November 2018, the party members loyal to Akhmetov decided to pause the negotiations.

On 9 November 2018, Opposition Bloc chairman Boyko and Vadim Rabinovich's party For Life signed an agreement for cooperation in the 2019 Ukrainian presidential election and the parliamentary election of the same year, and created the alliance Opposition Platform — For Life. The same day, Opposition Bloc leading members Vadym Novynskyi and Borys Kolesnikov claimed that the agreement was a "personal initiative" of Boyko and that the party had not taken any decisions on cooperation with For Life. On 17 November 2018, Opposition Platform — For Life nominated Boyko as its candidate in the 2019 Ukrainian presidential election. The same day, Opposition Bloc member Party of Development of Ukraine joined the Opposition Platform — For Life alliance. On 20 November 2018, Boyko and Serhiy Lyovochkin (the leading member of the Party of Development of Ukraine) were excluded from the Opposition Bloc faction because they "betrayed our voters' interests", according to the faction co-chairman, Vilkul.

On 17 December 2018, an Opposition Bloc congress nominated Oleksandr Vilkul as their candidate in the 2019 Ukrainian presidential election. A Ukrainian court had ruled three days before (in response to a lawsuit filed by People's Deputy of Ukraine for Opposition Bloc Serhiy Larin) that Opposition Bloc's congress, at which Vikul was to be nominated, could not "reorganize the party by any means". On 18 December 2018, the website of Opposition Bloc stated that therefore all of the decisions made at the congress were invalid. On 20 December 2018 the website of Opposition Bloc was down. Vilkul was nominated for the presidency again by Opposition Bloc — Party of Peace and Development (the recently renamed Industrial Party of Ukraine) on 20 January 2019. According to Liga.net, Rinat Akhmetov had renamed Industrial Party of Ukraine to Opposition Bloc — Party of Peace and Development solely to circumvent the court's injunction of 20 December 2018 (which prohibited any changes to the statute of the Opposition Bloc party). The Industrial Party of Ukraine was registered by the Ministry of Justice on 13 June 2014, and Rostyslav Shurma was then the chairman of that party. Shurma was at the time General Director of Zaporizhstal, part of the industrial complex owned by Rinat Akhmetov.

In the 2019 Ukrainian parliamentary election, an alliance was formed between Rinat Akhmetov's wing in the Opposition Bloc party and Borys Kolesnikov's and Oleksandr Vilkul's Party of Peace and Development. The alliance was later joined by Revival, Nashi, and Trust Deeds; the alliance selected Evgeny Murayev as leader of the united party list. In the election, the mayors of Kharkiv (Hennadiy Kernes) and Odessa (Gennadiy Trukhanov) were placed in the top ten of the nationwide party list.

In the 2019 Ukrainian parliamentary election, the party won six single-seat constituencies; the nationwide list, with 3.23% of the votes, did not overcome the 5% election barrier, so those six seats were the only seats that the party won in the election.

In the 2020 Ukrainian local elections the party gained 206 deputies (0.48% of all available mandates). It saw success in Zaporizhzhia Oblast, where it gained eight seats on the Zaporizhzhia Oblast Council.

By 2021, the party's activities had winded down significantly, and the Ukrainian press announced  that the political project itself was de facto closed. The party's leading figure, oligarch Rinat Akhmetov, announced the creation of a new political force in April 2021 on the basis of Opposition Bloc. In early May, one of the other key figures of Opposition Bloc Borys Kolesnikov announced the creation of a new political force Ukraine is Our Home.

On 20 March 2022 Opposition Bloc was one of several political parties suspended by the National Security and Defense Council of Ukraine during the 2022 Russian invasion of Ukraine, along with Derzhava, Left Opposition, Nashi, Opposition Platform — For Life, Party of Shariy, Progressive Socialist Party of Ukraine, Socialist Party of Ukraine, Union of Leftists, and the Volodymyr Saldo Block.

On 8 June 2022 the Eighth Administrative Court of Appeal banned the Opposition Bloc. The property of the party and all its branches were transferred to the state. The decision was open to an appeal at the Supreme Court of Ukraine. But the decision was not appealed, so on 25 July 2022 the party ceased to exist.

Election results

Verkhovna Rada

Presidential elections

Notes

See also

 Opposition Platform — For Life
 Party of Regions
 Opposition Bloc
 Nashi
 Revival
 Trust Deeds

References

External links
Official website

2019 establishments in Ukraine
2022 disestablishments in Ukraine
Banned political parties in Ukraine
Eurosceptic parties in Ukraine
Liberal parties in Ukraine
Parliamentary factions in Ukraine
Political parties established in 2019
Political parties disestablished in 2022
Regionalist parties in Ukraine
Russian political parties in Ukraine
Social liberal parties